The Tianning Temple, is a Buddhist temple located in Changzhou City, Jiangsu Province, China, is noted for its giant pagoda, the Tianning Pagoda. Construction began in April 2002 with the opening ceremony for the completed structure held on April 30, 2007, where a crowd of hundreds of Buddhist monks gathered for the ceremony. Although the existing pagoda was built by April 2007, the temple grounds and the pagoda have a history of construction and destruction for the past 1,350 years, since the time of the Tang dynasty (618–907). Building of the pagoda was proposed by the Buddhist Association of China in 2001, yet providing money donations for the temple was an international effort, as leaders of 108 Buddhist associations and temples worldwide attended the opening ceremony at the temple.

On 25 May 2006 the lower levels of the pagoda caught fire. However, no permanent damage was done.

Structural features

The tower is supported by a 6,500 t steel structure. The grounds for the Tianning Temple Pagoda occupies a space of 27,000 m2 (290,625 ft2). Complete with 68,038 kg (75 t) of gold and brass for the rooftops, additional bronze and jade decorations, and the use of wood imported from Myanmar and Papua New Guinea, the total cost of its construction was some 300 million yuan (US$38.5 million). The top story of the pagoda features a golden spire and a large bronze bell weighing 30,000 kg (33 t).

Religious significance
On the completion of the new pagoda at Tianning Temple, the mayor of Changzhou, Wang Weicheng, explicitly correlated his city's economic development with that of religious development in China. Following the end of religious persecution after the tumultuous Cultural Revolution (1966–1976), the Chinese Communist Party has relaxed its control over religion, especially Chinese Buddhism, which has some 100 million adherents within the People's Republic of China. The deputy abbot of Tianning Temple, Kuo Hui, said that like other religions Buddhism advocates peace and harmony, with ideas that could be beneficial to Chinese society. He also stated that the pagoda was rebuilt to "inherit the fine traditions of Buddhism and to honour Buddha." The pagoda is dedicated to Chinese Chan Buddhism.

Gallery

See also
Tianning Temple (Beijing)

Notes

External links

Yahoo video showing the temple grounds and the height of the pagoda from the ground

Buddhist temples in Changzhou
2002 establishments in China
Religious buildings and structures completed in 2007
Pagodas in China
Buildings and structures in Changzhou
Wooden buildings and structures in China